Henry Ford's America is a 1977 Canadian documentary film produced by the National Film Board of Canada and directed by Donald Brittain, and produced by Brittain, Paul Wright and Roman Kroitor.

Synopsis 
This feature documentary studies the automobile and its pervasive effect on the history of North America. Focusing on the Ford dynasty, from the original Henry car through to Henry II, the film demonstrates how society has adapted to fit the needs of the automobile.

Awards 
 International Emmy Awards, New York: Best Non-Fiction Television Film, 1977
 Golden Gate International Film Festival, San Francisco: Special Jury Award for Outstanding Achievement - Film as Communication, 1977
 Columbus International Film & Animation Festival, Columbus, Ohio: Chris Bronze Plaque, Social Studies, 1978
 HEMISFILM, San Antonio TX: Bronze Medallion for the Best Film, Documentary Over 27 Minutes, 1978
 American Film and Video Festival, New York: Red Ribbon, Features: History & Economics, 1978
 U.S. Industrial Film Festival, Elmhurst, Illinois: Silver Screen Award for Outstanding Creativity in the Production of Audio-Visual Communications in International Competition, 1978
 Chicago International Film Festival, Chicago: Certificate of Merit, 1977
 APGA Film Festival, Washington, DC: Honorable Mention, 1977

References

External links 
 
 
 

Canadian documentary films
National Film Board of Canada documentaries
Canadian documentary television films
1977 films
Films directed by Donald Brittain
1970s Canadian films